Geertruida Luberta de Haas-Lorentz (20 November 1885 – 1973) was a Dutch physicist and the first to perform fluctuational analysis of electrons as Brownian particles. Consequently she is considered to be the first woman to work in electrical noise theory.

Berta Lorentz was born in Leiden, Netherlands, the eldest daughter of the physicist and 1902 Nobel Prize winner Hendrik Lorentz and Aletta Catharina Kaiser. At that time her father was Professor of Theoretical Physics at the University of Leiden.

On 22 December 1910, she married Wander Johannes de Haas, who would become professor of experimental physics in Leiden, and they went on to have two sons and two daughters.

She studied physics at the University of Leiden with her father as dissertation advisor and earned her doctor's degree in 1912 on a thesis entitled "Over de theorie van de Brown'schen beweging en daarmede verwante verschijnselen" (On the theory of Brownian motion and related phenomena). After defending her doctoral dissertation in Leiden, de Haas-Lorentz taught physics at the Technical University of Delft and translated some of her father's works into German.

She was the first to carry out analysis of electron fluctuations as Brownian particles, work that is still cited.

Berta de Haas-Lorentz died in 1973 in Leiden.

Selected publications 
De Haas-Lorentz wrote or co-wrote many works on physics. She also contributed to the teaching of physics and wrote a biography of her father. According to WorldCat.org, she wrote 39 works in 114 publications in 4 languages. 
 Geertruida Luberta de Haas-Lorentz, Die Brownsche Bewegung und einige verwandte Erscheinungen, (Brownian motion and some related phenomena), Braunschweig, F. Vieweg, 1913. (Translated from Dutch to German by the author).
 H. A. Lorentz, A. D. Fokker,  Geertruida Luberta de Haas-Lorentz,  and H. Bremekamp, Lessen over theoretische natuurkunde: aan de Rijks-Universiteit te Leiden, Leiden: Brill, 1919-1926.
 Geertruida Luberta de Haas-Lorentz and H. A. Lorentz, Theorie der quanta, Leiden, N.V. Boekhandel en Drukkerij, Voorheen E.J. Brill, 1919.
H. A. Lorentz, Eva Dina Bruins, Johanna Reudler, and Geertruida Luberta de Haas-Lorentz, Kinetische Probleme, Leipzig, Akademische Verlagsgesellschaft, 1928.
 Geertruida Luberta de Haas-Lorentz, De beide hoofdwetten der thermodynamica en hare voornaamste toepassingen, 's-Gravenhage: Nijhoff, 1946.
Geertruida Luberta de Haas-Lorentz, H.A. Lorentz: Impressions of His Life and Work, (Translation by Joh. C. Fagginger Auer), Amsterdam, North-Holland Pub. Co., 1957.
Geertruida Luberta de Haas-Lorentz, ed. "H.A. Lorentz." American Journal of Physics 26.6 (1958): 412-

References

External links
 Ph.D. students of H.A. Lorentz: 1881-1921
Photo of De Haas-Lorentz
 
Dissertation of De Haas-Lorentz

1885 births
1973 deaths
20th-century Dutch physicists
Dutch women physicists
Leiden University alumni
People from Leiden
20th-century Dutch women scientists